Decriminalization or decriminalisation is the reclassification in law relating to certain acts or aspects of such to the effect that they are no longer considered a crime, including the removal of criminal penalties in relation to them. This reform is sometimes applied retroactively but otherwise comes into force from either the enactment of the law or from a specified date. In some cases regulated permits or fines may still apply (for contrast, see: legalization), and associated aspects of the original criminalized act may remain or become specifically classified as crimes. The term was coined by anthropologist Jennifer James to express sex workers' movements' "goals of removing laws used to target prostitutes", although it is now commonly applied to drug policies. The reverse process is criminalization.

Decriminalization reflects changing social and moral views. A society may come to the view that an act is not harmful, should no longer be criminalised, or is otherwise not a matter to be addressed by the criminal justice system. Examples of subject matter which have been the subject of changing views on criminality over time in various societies and countries include:

abortion
breastfeeding in public
drug possession, and recreational drug use
euthanasia
gambling
homosexuality
polygamy
prostitution
public nudity
steroid use in sport
suicide

In a federal country, acts may be decriminalized by one level of government while still subject to penalties levied by another; for example, possession of a decriminalized drug may still be subject to criminal charges by one level of government, but another may yet impose a monetary fine. This should be contrasted with legalization, which removes all or most legal detriments from a previously illegal act. It has also been noted that while some acts have been decriminalised, such as homosexuality and adultery, others have increased in their criminalization, such as incest.

Drug-use decriminalization topics

Decriminalization of non-medicinal marijuana in the United States
Legal history of cannabis in the United States
Cannabis legalization in Canada
Colorado Amendment 64
Marijuana Policy Project

Psilocybin decriminalization in the United States
Law Enforcement Against Prohibition
Legality of cannabis
Timeline of cannabis law
Responsible drug use
War on Drugs

See also

Drug liberalization
Drug policy of the Soviet Union
Legal issues of anabolic steroids
Legalization
Liberalization
Alcohol prohibition
Prostitution in Canada

Prostitution in Rhode Island 
Decriminalization of sex work
Public-order crime
Sex worker
Sodomy law
Timeline of LGBT history
Unenforced law
Victimless crime

References

Criminal law legal terminology
Drug policy reform